Hispania, Revista Española de Historia is a triannual peer-reviewed open access academic journal published by the Instituto de Historia of the Consejo Superior de Investigaciones Científicas. The editor-in-chief is Fernando García Sanz (Instituto de Historia). It was established in 1940 and covers history, from the ancient to the modern periods.

Abstracting and indexing
The journal is abstracted and indexed in the Arts and Humanities Citation Index, Current Contents/Arts & Humanities, and Scopus.

References

External links

History journals
Triannual journals
Publications established in 1940
Spanish-language journals